This is a list of submissions to the 65th Academy Awards for Best Foreign Language Film. The Academy Award for Best Foreign Language Film was created in 1956 by the Academy of Motion Picture Arts and Sciences to honour non-English-speaking films produced outside the United States. The award is handed out annually, and is accepted by the winning film's director, although it is considered an award for the submitting country as a whole. Countries are invited by the Academy to submit their best films for competition according to strict rules, with only one film being accepted from each country.

For the 65th Academy Awards, thirty-three films were submitted in the category Academy Award for Best Foreign Language Film. The titles in bold were the five nominated films, which came from Belgium, Germany, Russia, Uruguay (which was later disqualified) and the eventual winner, Indochina, from France. For the first time films from the former USSR competed against each other in this category; Estonia, Kazakhstan, Latvia and the Russian Federation submitted their first-ever films. After being disqualified the previous year since the country was not yet internationally recognized, Croatia had a film accepted for the first time.

Submissions

Notes

  The film A Place in the World, which was submitted by Uruguay, was disqualified after the nominations were announced in early 1993, when it was discovered that the film was an overwhelmingly Argentine production with minimal input from Uruguayans. Argentina had selected another film to compete for the award, so director Adolfo Aristarain asked Uruguay (which had never entered the competition before) to submit it instead. The Argentine film did not get nominated. A Place in the World was removed from the ballot (leaving only four films in contention for the award), causing the director to sue the Academy.

References

65